Nodular sclerosis (or "NSHL") is a form of Hodgkin's lymphoma that is the most common subtype of HL in developed countries. It affects females slightly more than males and has a median age of onset at ~28 years.  It is composed of large tumor nodules with lacunar Reed–Sternberg cell (RS cells) surrounded by fibrotic collagen bands.

The British National Lymphoma Investigation further categorized NSHL based upon Reed-Sternberg cells into "nodular sclerosis type I" (NS I) and "nodular sclerosis type II" (NS II), with the first subtype responding better to treatment.

References

External links 
 PubMed - use of Erythropoietin
 Subtypes
 Lymphoma Association information on nodular sclerosing

Histopathology
Hodgkin lymphoma